Nafi Toure (born 6 September 1971) is a Senegalese fencer. She competed in the women's individual sabre events at the 2004 and 2008 Summer Olympics.

References

External links
 

1971 births
Living people
Senegalese female sabre fencers
Olympic fencers of Senegal
Fencers at the 2004 Summer Olympics
Fencers at the 2008 Summer Olympics
People from Tambacounda Region